The Morris Motors Ground was a cricket ground in Coventry, Warwickshire.  The ground was owned by Morris Motors LImited, which operated in Coventry.  The first recorded match on the ground was in 1931, when Warwickshire played Northamptonshire, which was also the first first-class match held at the ground.  The following season the ground held its second and final first-class match, which was between Warwickshire and Leicestershire.

Additionally, the ground held a single Minor Counties Championship match when the Warwickshire Second XI played Durham in 1932.  Located along Bell Green Road, today the ground is covered by housing.

References

External links
Morris Motors Ground on CricketArchive
Morris Motors Ground on Cricinfo

Defunct cricket grounds in England
Cricket grounds in the West Midlands (county)
Sports venues in Coventry
Defunct sports venues in the West Midlands (county)
Sports venues completed in 1931